H17-206 was a high pressure steam locomotive built in Germany in 1925 by Henschel, on the Schmidt system. Rebuilt from a Prussian S 10.2.

The H17-206 was not repeated.

References

External links
Hochdruck: German High-Pressure Locomotives  Loco Locomotives

17.206
4-6-0 locomotives
H 17
Henschel locomotives
Railway locomotives introduced in 1925
Experimental locomotives
High-pressure steam locomotives
Individual locomotives of Germany
Standard gauge locomotives of Germany
Passenger locomotives